Kerbey Lane Cafe is a chain of restaurants predominantly in the Austin metropolitan area. The restaurant began serving its signature comfort food from a small bungalow on Kerbey Lane in Central Austin in 1980. The chain has since expanded into San Marcos via Texas State University in 2019 and added its eleventh location in San Antonio in 2022.

Reception
Zagat rated Kerbey Lane 4.1 for food, 3.7 for decor, and 4.0 for service, each on a scale of 5, and said, "They're always open at these round-the-clock Austin-area staples, slinging a solid Eclectic menu encompassing everything from awesome pancakes and to-die-for queso to burgers and seasonal specialties; though service can be hit-or-miss, the crowds keep coming because it's always dependable any time of day."

References

External links

 

Restaurants in Texas